Mark Oswald is a former American Funny Car driver and current Top Fuel crew chief.

Driving for Candies and Hughes, in 1984 Oswald did something no Funny Car driver had done before:  he won the championship in 3 different sanctioning bodies in the same year. NHRA, IHRA, American Hot Rod Association (AHRA)  The team took four IHRA titles between 1983 and 1987, including two in a row, 1986 and 1987, as well as beating John Force in the 1986 Big Bud Shootout (losing to him the next year). 

After retiring as a driver, Oswald became a crew chief, currently leading the crew for Antron Brown in the Matco Tools, US Army Top Fuel dragster.

Notes

Year of birth missing (living people)
Living people
Dragster drivers
American racing drivers